Roger Brown may refer to:

Arts and entertainment
Roger Brown (songwriter), American singer-songwriter from Texas, formerly on Decca Records
Roger Brown (artist) (1941–1997), American artist and Imagist
Roger Lee Brown (artist) (1950–2019), American artist
Roger Aaron Brown (born 1949), American character actor

Sports
Roger Brown (defensive tackle) (1937–2021), American football player
Roger Brown (defensive back) (born 1966), American football player 
Roger Brown (basketball, born 1942) (1942–1997), American basketball player in the ABA, member of Basketball Hall of Fame
Roger Brown (basketball, born 1950), American basketball player in the ABA and NBA
Roger Brown (cricketer) (born 1959), Australian first-class cricketer
Roger Brown (footballer) (1952–2011), English footballer
Roger Brown (rower) (born 1968), British Olympic rower

Others
Roger Brown (colonel)  (1749–1840), American soldier
Roger Brown (psychologist) (1925–1997), American social psychologist
Roger D. Brown, American politician from Texas
Roger H. Brown (born 1956), American business executive and academic administrator
Roger W. Brown (1940–2009), American lawyer and judge

See also